Christopher C. Summers (born February 5, 1988) is an American professional ice hockey defenseman who is currently an unrestricted free agent. He most recently played under contract with the then Thomas Sabo Ice Tigers of the Deutsche Eishockey Liga (DEL).

Playing career
As a youth, Summers played in the 2002 Quebec International Pee-Wee Hockey Tournament with the Detroit Honeybaked minor ice hockey team.

A native of Milan, Michigan, graduating Milan High School in 2006, Summers was drafted by the Phoenix Coyotes in the first round, 29th overall, in the 2006 NHL Entry Draft. Drafted from the USA Hockey National Team Development Program in Ann Arbor, Summers was recruited to play collegiate hockey with the University of Michigan. During the 2008–09 season, Summers was named an Alternate Captain for the Wolverines, but was promoted to co-captain after Mark Mitera was injured. The following season, his last season with the Wolverines, Summers was named team captain.

After his senior year in 2009–10, Summers signed a two-year entry level contract with the Coyotes on March 31, 2010. He was then assigned to AHL affiliate, the San Antonio Rampage on an amateur try out contract for the remainder of the season.

During the 2013–14 season, Summers scored his first NHL goal on March 15, 2014, against Joni Ortio of the Calgary Flames.

On March 1, 2015, Summers was included in a trade by the Coyotes to the New York Rangers along with defenseman Keith Yandle and a 2015 fourth round pick in exchange for defenseman John Moore, Anthony Duclair, and two draft picks (2016 first round and 2015 second round).

On April 20, 2016, Summers was recalled by the New York Rangers from the team's AHL affiliate, the Hartford Wolf Pack.

On July 1, 2017, Summers left the Rangers as a free agent and signed a two-year, two-way $650,000 contract with the Pittsburgh Penguins.  Summers played the duration of his contract exclusively with AHL affiliate, the Wilkes-Barre/Scranton Penguins.

As a free agent from the Penguins, Summers signed his first contract abroad, agreeing to a two-year deal with German club, Thomas Sabo Ice Tigers of the DEL, on July 24, 2019.

Career statistics

Regular season and playoffs

International

References

External links
 

1988 births
American men's ice hockey defensemen
Arizona Coyotes draft picks
Arizona Coyotes players
Hartford Wolf Pack players
Ice hockey people from Ann Arbor, Michigan
Living people
Michigan Wolverines men's ice hockey players
People from Milan, Michigan
National Hockey League first-round draft picks
New York Rangers players
Phoenix Coyotes players
Portland Pirates players
San Antonio Rampage players
Thomas Sabo Ice Tigers players
Wilkes-Barre/Scranton Penguins players